Niki Manolakou (born June 15, 1978 in Piraeus, Greece) is a Greek female retired professional volleyball player, who played for and captained Greek powerhouse Olympiacos Piraeus. She was a member of the club for more than 15 years (1990–2005 and 2006–2007). Manolakou played the setter position.

References

External links
 profile at greekvolley.gr 

1978 births
Living people
Olympiacos Women's Volleyball players
Greek women's volleyball players
Sportspeople from Piraeus
21st-century Greek women